The canton of Charvieu-Chavagneux is an administrative division of the Isère department, eastern France. It was created at the French canton reorganisation which came into effect in March 2015. Its seat is in Charvieu-Chavagneux.

It consists of the following communes:
 
Annoisin-Chatelans
Anthon
Charvieu-Chavagneux
Chavanoz
Chozeau
Crémieu
Dizimieu
Hières-sur-Amby
Janneyrias
Leyrieu
Moras
Panossas
Pont-de-Chéruy
Saint-Baudille-de-la-Tour
Saint-Hilaire-de-Brens
Saint-Romain-de-Jalionas
Siccieu-Saint-Julien-et-Carisieu
Tignieu-Jameyzieu
Trept
Vénérieu
Vernas
Veyssilieu
Villemoirieu
Villette-d'Anthon

References

Cantons of Isère